Saat Paake Bandha is a 2009 Indian Bengali drama film directed by Sujit Mondal. The film starred Jeet and Koyel Mullick, who also featured in Ghatak in 2006. The movie is a remake of 1996 Telugu movie Pavitra Bandham.

Plot
Rahul (Jeet), the son of a wealthy but traditional industrialist, returned home to his father after completing his academic career in foreign lands. When the father tries to persuade him in his marriage he puts up a fantastic condition -  that he will marry the girl of his father's choice and will live as married couple for one year only, after which, if either of the two seems to feel distant from the other, the marriage will be called off. Surprisingly, the traditional father agrees and chooses Pallavi (Koel Mallick), his PA as the most appropriate bride.

Now Pallavi's family consisted of her widowed mother, an elder sister deprived of her husband, a younger brother not at all competent for any job, and the youngest sister getting pregnant with the boyfriend trying to avoid responsibilities. So Pallavi, just to save her family, accepted the contract much against her wishes and thus began a curious way of life with both of the wedlocked couple leading an unreal lifestyle.

Though both shared the same bed, but Rahul seemed to be oddly insensitive to Pallavi's emotions. Thus it was not strange that he never cared to celebrate Pallavi's birthday and his scathing remarks while appreciating Pallavi's cooking hurt her feelings and duty seemed the only virtue that kept Rahul any closer to his wife. But the artificiality of the story is vividly brought to fore when Rahul, after quickly recovering from a comatose condition, chiefly due to Pallavi's sincerest nursing, does not hesitate to declare that the next day is the end of their contract term when he will be willingly divorcing Pallavi. Well at this point if the audience thought that the story is nearing a tragic completion, it is only the Intermission that is declared.

In the second half we see that the table turns as Rahul suddenly feels sympathetic to Pallavi and all his passions overwhelms him so much that he rushes to his in-laws' house and requests Pallavi's return. But no says the director, and the story goes on with Pallavi now rejecting all the ardent proposals of Rahul, be it him buying all the shares of Pallavi's new struggling organization just to secure for himself the position of Pallavi's boss. Surprises seem to be on store for the audience with Pallavi conceiving a child (just imagine that Rahul was in comatose for a pretty long time and the day he recovered, the couple separated) and now Rahul, in sympathy arranges for an AC bus for her and shifts her office to the ground floor. Now the only thing that remains is revelation and Pallavi invites and insults Rahul in one of the most improbable of settings with Rahul sophisticatedly defending his views.

Now, it's the final part. Rahul with his friend Kesto arranges a last chance to bring back Pallavi. Rahul plans to act as beaten by some goons who were after their company for a long time. Pallavi instantly runs to see Rahul just after getting the news. But, on the way she incidentally learns everything. So, at that condition she goes to Rahul's house to insult him again and close the whole chapter completely. But, the matter turns more serious, when she finds out Rahul really severely injured and that he was not acting. She also gets wounded while trying to help Rahul. Next, we find out Rahul somehow taking Pallavi to the Maternity Ward.

Finally after all these, the two again reunites in hospital bed and they celebrate the simultaneous delivery of the child and Rahul's recovery from his critical condition. Thus family ties are again restored and the happy ending is guaranteed.

Cast
 Jeet as Rahul Banerjee
 Koel Mallick as Pallavi Banerjee
 Ranjit Mallick as Subhankar Banerjee, Rahul's Father
 Locket Chatterjee as Pallavi's Sister
 Laboni Sarkar as Pallavi's Mother
 Subhasish Mukherjee as Krishnokanto Barman aka Keshto, Rahul's friend
 Premjit Mukherjee as Shankar
 Nitya Ganguly as Shibu Kaka, Rahul's house servant
 Supriyo Dutta
 Monalisa Pal

Soundtrack

References

External links

2009 films
Bengali-language Indian films
Bengali remakes of Telugu films
2000s Bengali-language films
Films scored by Jeet Ganguly
2009 romantic drama films
Indian romantic drama films